On July 19 and 20, 2018, an unexpected strong tornado outbreak affected Iowa and nearby areas. The event was triggered mostly by three supercells that produced several tornadoes across southeastern Iowa east and southeast of Des Moines. Two of the tornadoes reached EF3 intensity, affecting Pella and Marshalltown. These were the strongest tornadoes to hit Iowa since June 22, 2015, when another EF3 tornado struck near Lovilia. Of the 37 injuries, 13 occurred in Pella, and 23 in Marshalltown, and one the following day in Indiana. The event was also notable due to the Table Rock Lake duck boat accident that killed 17 people and injured 7 others at Table Rock Lake, Missouri.

Meteorological history 
The tornado outbreak as well as the other the severe weather that day was either poorly forecasted or essentially unforecasted; the outlook from the Storm Prediction Center that day had much of eastern Iowa under a 2% risk area for tornadoes. This was due to an inaccurate analysis of a closed low over the northern part of the sate. At the time, the low was analyzed as being closed at the 500 mb level. However, reanalysis of the event revealed that the low was closed at only 700 mb. As the event began, several weak supercells formed over central Iowa and moved eastward, producing multiple weak tornadoes. However, one supercell produced two simultaneous EF2 tornadoes in Bondurant. Shortly afterwards, a tornado watch was issued for the region from 3:10–10 pm CDT. However, a significant tornado outbreak was still not expected as the threat for tornadoes was only increased to 5% at the 20:00 UTC outlook, indicating the threat of only a couple of tornadoes. At 21:00 UTC on July 19 (4 pm CDT), a large Storm-Relative Helicity (SRH) and low level wind shear was reported across the region. The dewpoints were also in the 70s°F (20s°C), which is moist for this type of event. Around this time, the southern-most storm evolved into a large tornadic supercell and moved southeastward, producing several tornadoes, including an EF3 tornado that passed near Pella. The Bondurant supercell than weakened, but another strong supercell developed to its north and absorbed it as it moved eastward. Fueled by an interaction with an outflow boundary from the southern supercell, the storm produced a large, wedge EF3 tornado that directly struck the town of Marshalltown. Afterwards, the northern supercell and the storms north of it weakened, but the southern supercell continued southeastward and eventually transitioned into a small squall line.

As the system trekked eastwards into July 20, damaging winds and hail became the main threat, with a 30% chance of strong wind across much of Arkansas, Tennessee and Kentucky, and a 45% chance of damaging hail across central Tennessee and Kentucky. However, a 10% tornado risk was also issued for western Tennessee and eastern Kentucky, with the threat of tornadoes stretching from western Arkansas to southern Michigan. An EF1 tornado in Indiana caused an injury to a camper, who was flipped over. However, that was the only casualty, as no tornadoes that day were stronger than EF1 intensity.

Confirmed tornadoes

July 19 event

July 20 event

Non-tornadic effects 

As part of the storm system as a whole, a duck boat tour sank in Table Rock Lake, Missouri, at approximately 7 pm CDT. Of the 31 people on board, 17 of them died and 7 were injured. Nine of them were in a single family. A wind gust in Branson, Missouri reached .

Impact and aftermath
Pella had 14,000 power outages while Bondurant, which got hit by an EF2 tornado, had 1,800 outages. Despite the damage and injuries, though, no one died due to tornadoes, which is likely credited to timely warnings once the tornadoes actually did touch down. Following these tornadoes, several counties in Iowa were declared disaster zones by Kim Reynolds. Marsalltown would suffer even more destruction just over two years later when a powerful derecho produced widespread destruction across the city. Several buildings in downtown Marshalltown were condemned and demolished in the following years as a result of both storms.

See also
 List of North American tornadoes and tornado outbreaks
 Iowa tornado outbreak of November 2005 – A small but strong tornado outbreak centered in Iowa
 Tornado outbreak of April 9–11, 2011 – Featured an EF4 tornado in Iowa

Notes

References

Tornadoes in Iowa
F3 tornadoes
Tornadoes of 2018